In the 10th edition of Systema Naturae, Carl Linnaeus classified the arthropods, including insects, arachnids and crustaceans, among his class "Insecta". True bugs and thrips were brought together under the name Hemiptera.

Cicada (cicadas)
Cicada laternaria – Fulgora lanternaria
Cicada candelaria – Pyrops candelarius
Cicada phosphorea  – Raphirhinus phosphoreus
Cicada noctivida  – Mitrops noctivida
Cicada lucernaria  – Homalodisca lucernaria
Cicada foliata  – Membracis foliata
Cicada fronditia  – Stegaspis fronditia
Cicada squamigera – Enchenopa squamigera
Cicada crux  – Hemikyptha crux
Cicada cornuta  – Centrotus cornutus
Cicada aurita – Ledra aurita
Cicada ciliaris – Hamaza ciliaris
Cicada quadrifasciata – Cardioscarta quadrifasciata
Cicada bifasciata  – Planaphrodes bifasciata
Cicada fornicata  – Paranistria fornicata
Cicada stridula – Platypleura stridula
Cicada orni
Cicada repanda  – Pycna repanda
Cicada reticulata  – Aetalion reticulatum
Cicada tibicen – Tibicen tibicen
Cicada septendecim – Magicicada septendecim, periodical cicada
Cicada violacea  – Pinheya violacea
Cicada coleoptrata  – Lepyronia coleoptrata
Cicada spumaria, Cicada leucophthalma, Cicada leucocephala, Cicada lateralis, Cicada flava – Philaenus spumarius
Cicada nervosa  – Cixius nervosus
Cicada albifrons – Anoscopus albifrons
Cicada striata – Psammotettix striatus
Cicada lineata – Neophilaenus lineatus
Cicada interrupta – Evacanthus interruptus
Cicada vittata – Eupteryx vittata
Cicada aptera – Halticus apterus
Cicada phalaenoides – Poekilloptera phalaenoides
Cicada lanata – Lystra lanata
Cicada rubra – Sphenorhina rubra
Cicada viridis – Cicadella viridis
Cicada aurata – Eupteryx aurata
Cicada ulmi – Ribautiana ulmi
Cicada rosae – Edwardsiana rosae

Notonecta (backswimmers)
Notonecta glauca 
Notonecta striata – Sigara striata
Notonecta minutissima – Micronecta minutissima

Nepa (water scorpions)
Nepa grandis - Lethocerus grandis 
Nepa rubra - Nepa cinerea
Nepa fusca - Laccotrephes brachialis
Nepa atra 
Nepa cinerea 
Nepa cimicoides - Ilyocoris cimicoides
Nepa linearis – Ranatra linearis

Cimex (shield bugs & bedbugs)
Cimex lectularius – bedbug
Cimex stockerus – Chrysocoris stockerus
Cimex scarabaeoides  – Thyreocoris scarabaeoides
Cimex maurus  – Eurygaster maura
Cimex lineatus – Graphosoma lineatum
Cimex arabs – Edessa arabs
Cimex serratus – Edessa serrata
Cimex stolidus – Edessa stolida
Cimex histrio, Cimex peregrinator – Dinocoris histrio
Cimex littoralis – Salda littoralis
Cimex rugosus – Nabis rugosus
Cimex clavicornis – Copium clavicorne
Cimex corticalis – Aradus corticalis
Cimex betulae – Aradus betulae
Cimex erosus – Phymata erosa
Cimex filicis – Monalocoris filicis
Cimex cardui – Tingis cardui
Cimex bidens – Picromerus bidens                  
Cimex rufipes – Pentatoma rufipes
Cimex marginatus – Coreus marginatus
Cimex bipustulatus – Leptoscelis bipustulatus
Cimex ypsilon – Mormidea ypsilon
Cimex punctatus – Rhacognathus punctatus
Cimex haemorrhoidalis – Acanthosoma haemorrhoidale
Cimex valgus – Elasmopoda valga
Cimex quadrispinosus – Ricolla quadrispinosa
Cimex acantharis – Heza acantharis
Cimex viridulus – Nezara viridula, southern green stink bug
Cimex bipunctatus – Stagonomus bipunctatus
Cimex sexpunctatus – Hyrmine sexpunctata
Cimex griseus – Elasmucha grisea
Cimex interstinctus – Elasmostethus interstinctus
Cimex baccarum – Dolycoris baccarum
Cimex dumosus – Jalla dumosa
Cimex variolosus – Dinocoris variolosus
Cimex juniperinus – Chlorochroa juniperina
Cimex caeruleus – Zicrona caerulea 
Cimex lineola – Largus lineola
Cimex oleraceus – Eurydema oleracea
Cimex biguttatus – Adomerus biguttatus
Cimex bicolor – Tritomegas bicolor
Cimex ornatus – Eurydema ornata
Cimex ruber – Deraeocoris ruber
Cimex acuminatus – Aelia acuminata
Cimex leucocephalus – Strongylocoris leucocephalus
Cimex minutus – Orius minutus
Cimex personatus – Reduvius personatus
Cimex annulatus – Rhynocoris annulatus
Cimex ater – Capsus ater
Cimex gothicus – Capsodes gothicus
Cimex indus – Nematopus indus
Cimex hyoscyami – Corizus hyoscyami
Cimex equestris – Lygaeus equestris
Cimex apterus – Pyrrhocoris apterus
Cimex aegyptius – Scantius aegyptius
Cimex andreae – Dysdercus andreae
Cimex kalmii, Cimex umbratilis – Orthops kalmii
Cimex pratensis – Lygus pratensis
Cimex campestris – Orthops campestris
Cimex crassicornis – Stictopleurus crassicornis
Cimex saltatorius – Saldula saltatoria
Cimex arenarius – Trapezonotus arenarius
Cimex pini – Rhyparochromus pini
Cimex rolandri – Aphanus rolandri
Cimex nigripes – Calliclopius nigripes
Cimex laevigatus – Stenodema laevigatum
Cimex dolabratus – Leptopterna dolabrata
Cimex striatus – Miris striatus
Cimex erraticus – Notostira erratica
Cimex ferus – Nabis ferus
Cimex populi – Phytocoris populi
Cimex ulmi – Phytocoris ulmi
Cimex sylvestris – Ligyrocoris sylvestris
Cimex bimaculatus – Closterotomus fulvomaculatus
Cimex calcaratus – Alydus calcaratus
Cimex abietis – Eremocoris abietis
Cimex kermesinus – Ugnius kermesinus
Cimex lacustris – Gerris lacustris, common water strider
Cimex stagnorum – Hydrometra stagnorum
Cimex vagabundus – Empicoris vagabundus
Cimex tipularius – Neides tipularius
Cimex coryli, Cimex mutabilis – Phylus coryli

Aphis (aphids)
Aphis ribis – Cryptomyzus ribis
Aphis ulmi – Tetraneura ulmi
Aphis pastinacae – Cavariella pastinacae
Aphis sambuci
Aphis rumicis
Aphis lychnidis – Brachycaudus lychnidis
Aphis padi – Rhopalosiphum padi
Aphis rosae – Macrosiphum rosae rose aphid
Aphis tiliae – Eucallipterus tiliae
Aphis brassicae – Brevicoryne brassicae, cabbage aphid
Aphis craccae
Aphis lactucae – Hyperomyzus lactucae
Aphis cirsii – Uroleucon cirsii
Aphis cardui – Brachycaudus cardui
Aphis tanaceti – Uroleucon tanaceti
Aphis absinthii – Macrosiphoniella absinthii
Aphis jaceae – Uroleucon jaceae
Aphis betulae – Glyphina betulae
Aphis roboris – Lachnus roboris
Aphis quercus – Stomaphis quercus
Aphis pini – Cinara pini
Aphis salicis – Pterocomma salicis
Aphis populi – Pachypappa populi
Aphis bursaria – Pemphigus bursarius
Aphis urticae – Orthezia urticae

Chermes (woolly aphids)
Chermes graminis - nomen dubium
Chermes ulmi - Eriosoma ulmi
Chermes cerastii - Trioza cerastii
Chermes pyri - Cacopsylla pyri
Chermes buxi - Psylla buxi
Chermes urticae - Trioza urticae
Chermes betulae - Psylla betulae
Chermes alni - Psylla alni
Chermes quercus - nomen dubium
Chermes abietis - Adelges abietis
Chermes salicis - nomen dubium
Chermes fraxini - Psyllopsis fraxini
Chermes aceris - Rhinocola aceris
Chermes ficus- Homotoma ficus

Coccus (scale insects)

Coccus hesperidum
Coccus aonidum – Chrysomphalus aonidum
Coccus quercus – Kermes quercus
Coccus ilicis – Kermes ilicis
Coccus betulae, Coccus carpini, Coccus oxyacanthae & Coccus vitis – Pulvinaria vitis
Coccus ulmi – Lepidosaphes ulmi
Coccus coryli & Coccus tiliae – Eulecanium tiliae
Coccus rusci – Ceroplastes rusci
Coccus salicis – Chionaspis salicis
Coccus polonicus, Coccus pilosellae – Polish cochineal (Porphyrophora polonica)
Coccus phalaridis – [nomen dubium]
Coccus cacti – Protortonia cacti

Thrips (thrips)
Thrips physapus 
Thrips minutissima – Thrips minutissimus 
Thrips juniperina – Thrips juniperinus 
Thrips fasciata – Aeolothrips fasciatus

Footnotes

References

Systema Naturae
 Systema Naturae, Hemiptera